Apeleto "Albert" Likuvalu (born 14 November 1943) is a politician from Wallis and Futuna.

He ran as a socialist candidate in 2002, receiving 928 votes in the first round and coming third. In 2005 after an alliance between the socialists and centre-right parties he was elected President of the Territorial Assembly of Wallis and Futuna. While president, he supported the  Lavelua, Tomasi Kulimoetoke II, in his dispute with the French colonial government; as a result France's overseas territories minister Francois Baroin refused to meet with him. He was replaced as president of the assembly in November 2005, and later served as leader of the opposition.

He was elected to the National Assembly of France in the 2007 French legislative election, the first time that a socialist candidate had been elected from Wallis and Futuna. As a deputy he sat with the Socialist, Radical, Citizen and Miscellaneous Left group in the Assembly. He lost his seat in 2012.

He ran for the Senate in the 2020 French Senate election, coming third with 23% of the vote.

References

1943 births
Living people
Wallis and Futuna politicians
Deputies of the 13th National Assembly of the French Fifth Republic
Members of Parliament for Wallis and Futuna